Mount Bierstadt is a  mountain summit in the Front Range of the Rocky Mountains, in the U.S. state of Colorado. It was named in honor of Albert Bierstadt, an American landscape painter who made the first recorded summit of the mountain in 1863.

Mountain

Because it is generally considered an easy climb, along with its accessibility from nearby Denver, Mount Bierstadt is one of the most popular mountains to climb in Colorado.  As with most peaks in Colorado, July and August make the best months for climbing Mount Bierstadt.

The most popular base from which to begin ascent of Mount Bierstadt is Guanella Pass, located to the west. The trail  descends slightly into the fairly level marshlands surrounding Scott Gomer Creek before reaching Bierstadt's western slopes. On the rocky upper regions of the mountain the route of the trail is marked by a series of cairns. Alternative trails cover the eastern slopes for longer hikes.

Once at the summit, a popular option is to continue the hike to nearby Mount Evans along a ridge known as The Sawtooth, an intermediate-level hike that overlooks Abyss Lake, which occupies the bottom of the valley separating Bierstadt and Evans.

Albert Bierstadt's painting A Storm in the Rocky Mountains, Mt. Rosalie is based on sketches he made during his 1863 visit to the area.

See also
List of mountain peaks of Colorado
List of Colorado fourteeners

References

External links

 
Mount Bierstadt on Distantpeak.com
Mount Bierstadt on TrailCentral.com
GPS Tracks from Guanella Pass on SelectHikes.com
Mount Bierstadt Trail (#711) on Forest Service website
A Storm in the Rocky Mountains by Albert Bierstadt

Mountains of Colorado
Mountains of Clear Creek County, Colorado
Fourteeners of Colorado
North American 4000 m summits